Frank Riseley defeated Major Ritchie  6–0, 6–1, 6–2 in the All Comers' Final, but the reigning champion Laurence Doherty defeated Riseley 6–1, 7–5, 8–6 in the challenge round to win the gentlemen's singles tennis title at the 1904 Wimbledon Championships.

Draw

Challenge round

All comers' finals

Top half

Section 1

Section 2

Bottom half

Section 3

Section 4

References

External links

Men's Singles
Wimbledon Championship by year – Men's singles